The Chile national handball team is controlled by the Chilean Handball Federation, and takes part in international team handball competitions. It is affiliated to the IHF and the PATHF.

Honours
Pan American Games
Runners-up: 2019
3rd place: 2011, 2015

Pan American Championship
Runners-up: 2016
Third place: 2010, 2012, 2014, 2018

Participation in 2011 World Championship
The Chile national handball team participated in the 2011 World Men's Handball Championship in Group D. On 13 January they played their first match against Sweden, losing 18–28. Against South Korea they lost 22–37, versus Poland 23–38, but against Slovakia they tied the game 29–29, obtaining a historic result in this competition. Finally they lost against Argentina 25–35, remaining in the last place the group with only one point.

Competitions records

Olympic Games

World Championship

Record against other teams at the World Championship

Pan American Games

Record against other teams at the Pan American Games

Pan American Championship

South and Central American Championship

Other competitions

2015 Four Nations Tournament – 4th
2016 Four Nations Tournament – 2nd
2017 Four Nations Tournament – 4th
2017 Bolivarian Games – 
2018 South American Games – 
2021 Junior Pan American Games – 
2022 Bolivarian Games – 
2022 South American Games –

Team

Current squad
Squad for the 2023 World Men's Handball Championship.

Head coach: Aitor Etxaburu

Statistics

Most capped players

Top scorers

Youth teams

World Junior Championship

Record against other teams at the World Junior Championship

World Youth Championship

Record against other teams at the World Youth Championship

Kit suppliers
Chile's kit are currently supplied by Select Sport.

References

External links

IHF profile

Men's national handball teams
Handball in Chile
H